The Democratic Force (Spanish: Fuerza Democrática) is a Peruvian political party. At the legislative elections held on  9 April 2006, the party won 1.4% of the popular vote but no seats in the Congress of the Republic.

References 

Political parties in Peru

fr:Force démocrate (Roumanie)